This was the first edition of the tournament.

Max Mirnyi and Philipp Oswald won the title, defeating Wesley Koolhof and Artem Sitak in the final, 6–4, 4–6, [10–6].

Seeds

Draw

Draw

References
 Main Draw

New York Open
New York Open (tennis)